Jose Mario Emerciane Vaz (19 March 1938 – 31 July 2002) was an Indian politician and freedom fighter from Goa. He was a former member of the Goa Legislative Assembly and represented the Cuncolim Assembly constituency from 1980 to 1984. Vaz also contributed in the Goa Liberation Movement.

Early and personal life
Jose Mario Vaz was born in Cuncolim. He completed his Secondary School Certificate from St. Stanislaus High School. He later did his graduation in Bachelor of Arts from St. Xavier's College, Bombay (now Mumbai). Vaz was also an alumnus of Dhempe College, Panaji.

Vaz was married to Pulcheria Vaz and resided at Nangila, Cuncolim until his death in 2002.

Career

Politics
Prior to winning the seat in the Goa Legislative Assembly, Vaz was a Sarpanch of Cuncolim Village panchayat from 1968 to 1972. He contested in the Goa, Daman and Diu Legislative Assembly election on the Congress ticket and emerged victorious.

Teaching
Vaz was also a headmaster of Our Lady of Health High School, Cuncolim from 1964 to 1979 and St. Xavier's High School.

Role in Goa's freedom struggle
Vaz was a member of the Azad Gomantak Dal. He was also a joint secretary of the "Goan Students Association Bombay". In 1956, under his leadership, Vaz held an assembly at Bombay for the immediate withdrawal of the Portuguese colonial rulers in Goa. Following this event, the Portuguese government blacklisted Vaz and was banned entry in Goa till Goa Liberation Day.

Positions held
 Member of Library Committee 1980–81
 Member of the committee to solve the dispute between Ramponcars and Mechanized Boat Operators
 Member of the Select Committee on Bill No. 27 of The Goa, Daman and Diu Education Bill 1980 
 Ex-President of Cuncolim Union, Goa 
 Executive Committee member of the Headmasters Association.

References

1938 births
2002 deaths
Indian National Congress politicians from Goa
People from South Goa district